Shurab Rural District may refer to:

Shurab Rural District (Fars Province)
Shurab Rural District (Lorestan Province)